Remix Dystemper is a 1998 remix album of Skinny Puppy tracks, by various artists. An early pressing of the Remix DysTemper album shipped with all the proper artwork, but the disc contained Christian gospel music instead of the Skinny Puppy remixes. A promo version of the album contained only eight tracks, omitting tracks 3, 4, 10, 11, 12.

Both the "Rodent" remix by Hiwatt and the "Spasmolytic" remix by Deftones appeared on different soundtracks of the famous Saw franchise. "Rodent" appeared on the soundtrack for Saw II while "Spasmolytic" appeared on the soundtrack for Saw IV. The Hiwatt remix of "Rodent" appeared in the video game LittleBigPlanet 3.

Track listing

References

Remix Dys Temper
Skinny Puppy remix albums
Nettwerk Records remix albums